William Crocker may refer to:

William Crocker (of Devon), a 14th-century English Member of Parliament
William Henry Crocker (1861–1937), American banker and member of the Republican Party
William L. Crocker, Jr., American politician and journalist
William Maunder Crocker (1843–1899), administrator in Borneo